The Taubenklippe is a rock formation in the Harz mountains in the German state of Saxony-Anhalt. From the crag there is a good view over Harz Foreland, the heights near Bad Harzburg and the highest mountain in the Har, the Brocken. The Taubenklippe may be reached from the Ecker valley on a footpath, some 6 km long, that starts in Ilsenburg.

The Taubenklippe is checkpoint number 4 in the Harzer Wandernadel hiking trail network.

See also: List of rock formations in the Harz

Rock formations of the Harz